Matyshevo is a rural locality (a settlement) in Matyshevskoye Rural Settlement, Rudnyansky District, Volgograd Oblast, Russia. The population was 134 as of 2010.

Geography 
Matyshevo is located in steppe, on the Khopyorsko-Buzulukskaya Plain, 30 km northwest of Rudnya (the district's administrative centre) by road. Matyshevo (selo) is the nearest rural locality.

References 

Rural localities in Rudnyansky District, Volgograd Oblast
Atkarsky Uyezd